Anthony Joshua vs. Joseph Parker, billed as Road to Undisputed, was a professional boxing heavyweight unification match contested between Anthony Joshua and Joseph Parker. The event took place on 31 March 2018 at Principality Stadium in Cardiff, Wales, with Joshua's WBA (Super), IBF, and IBO titles and Parker's WBO title on the line. Joshua won the fight by unanimous decision, marking the first time he went the distance. Two judges scored it 118–110 and the other 119–109 all in favor of Joshua

Background 
It was reported that Joseph Parker's team were looking at Lucas Browne as a potential match-up if they failed to land a unification fight with Joshua. According to Parker's promoter David Higgins, a date in March 2018 was being discussed with Joshua's team, however Eddie Hearn offered an 80–20 split, which would favour Joshua. Higgins spoke to Fairfax Media, saying the offer would need to be more reasonable, also taking into consideration the fight would take place in the UK. Other names discussed for a summer 2018 fight included Bryant Jennings and Alexander Povetkin.

According to a Tweet from Parker on 15 November 2017, he was offered less than half of what was paid to Charles Martin when he defended his IBF title against Joshua. The next day, Higgins told Fairfax Media that he and Hearn were still negotiating a deal that would benefit all parties. Parker stated he was willing to drop to 35% of the net profit. Higgins made a final offer to Hearn on 22 November 2017. He told Sky Sports, "It's our final bottom line decision. We feel anything less is disrespectful or a disgrace." On 29 November 2017, Hearn stated the fight could be confirmed within two weeks. Higgins listed Camp Nou as the potential venue.

According to Hearn on 11 December 2017, a deal was very close to being announced with the Principality Stadium a frontrunner to host the fight. Hearn said they were over-paying Parker, with the deal being 65-35. On 28 December 2017, Higgins announced that a split had been agreed which would see Parker earn between 30–35% of the purse and the fight should take place in April 2018. Higgins stated that a rematch clause would be in place for Joshua, should he lose. In a potential rematch, Parker would get a 55% split. It was reported that Joshua would earn a career-high £18 million and Parker would also earn a career-high pay of £8 million.

On 8 January 2018, the Principality Stadium in Cardiff was confirmed as the venue for the fight. On 14 January 2018, negotiations came to a close and the fight was officially announced to take place on 31 March in Cardiff, live on Sky Sports Box Office. In an official press release on 5 February 2018, Showtime announced they would televise the fight live in the United States.

Weigh-in 
Joshua and Parker both came in lighter compared to their respective previous bouts. Parker weighed in first at 236.7 pounds, his lightest since he fought Solomon Haumono in July 2016. Joshua weighed 242.2 pounds, his lightest since 2014 when he fought Michael Sprott.

The fight 

Joshua was forced to go the distance to defeat Parker via a 12-round unanimous decision to claim the WBO title as well as retain his WBA (Super), IBF, and IBO belts. The judges scored the fight 118-110, 118-110 and 119-109 in favour of Joshua. Many media outlets, including ESPN, had the fight much closer, generally around 116-112 with Joshua the clear winner. With going the distance, Joshua's 20 fight knockout streak came to an end. Parker used his movement well to slip a lot of Joshua's attacks but in doing so did not do enough himself to win more rounds. Parker started the fight on the back-foot, allowing Joshua to take the opening rounds. There was an accidental clash of heads in round three, however neither boxer was cut from this. There was another accidental clash of heads in round nine where the referee called for a short break. Joshua's tape on his left glove kept coming loose and he was ordered to go back to his corner for a re-tape. Parker suffered a cut over his left eye from an accidental elbow. In round twelve, neither boxer engaged as much as expected with Joshua trying to track Parker down, who again, on the backfoot looked to survive the round. The fight was marred by Italian referee Giuseppe Quartarone, who kept both boxers from fighting on the inside. This mostly had negative impact on Parker, where he was seen to have the most success. The referee was breaking the action each time both boxers were on the inside, even when they were still throwing shots. Many boxers, pundits and both the Sky Sports and Showtime broadcast team criticised the referee during and after the fight.

CompuBox punch stats showed that Joshua landed 139 of 383 punches thrown (36.3%) and Parker landed 101 of his 492 thrown (20.5%). Joshua used his reach advantage and utilised his jab more often from round seven and onwards. In total, Joshua landed 93 jabs with a connect rate of 34.4%. Parker landed 49 jabs with a much lower connect rate of 15.5%. Parker was the busier power puncher of the two, landing 52 power punches which included 29 to the body of Joshua (29.5%). Joshua was more accurate with his power shots in landing 46 with a connect rate of 40.7%.

Post fight 
After the fight, Joshua explained his game plan for the fight, "My strategy in there was kind of stick behind the jab. It’s one of the most important weapons. The old saying is the right hand could take you around the block, but a good jab will take you around the world. And that secured another championship belt. So I stuck behind the jab and I made sure anything that was coming back, I was switched on, I was focused and 12 rounds, baby! I thought it was hard, right?"

Parker was humble in defeat and stated he would back stronger, "Today I got beaten by a better champion, bigger man. A lot to work on. It was a good experience being here. Thank you all for the opportunity to fight in this big stadium. We’re gonna go back, train hard, plan again and come back stronger. No regrets, you know, take it on the chin. … So we’ll be back again." When asked what he would do different, Parker replied, "Work harder. Come back stronger, more punches. But I would love to have another go. Just back to the drawing board."

During the post fight press conference, Parker's team stated the referee did not speak English, whereas Joshua and his promoter Hearn disagreed and said he spoke English fluently.

Viewership and revenue 

On Sky Box Office, the fight sold 1.457million pay-per-view buys in the United Kingdom. At a viewing price of £19.95 ($), the fight grossed approximately £million in pay-per-view revenue.

The fight was shown live in the United States on Showtime in the afternoon. The live showing averaged 346,000 viewers and peaked at 379,000 viewers. A replay was shown later in the evening which saw an increase. The replay averaged 430,000 viewers and peaked at 483,000 viewers. Nielsen Media Research., who released the figures do not have the facility to measure whether the same customers that watched the live showing tuned in for the replay. These figures were an increase for Joshua on Showtime, as his last fight on Showtime against Carlos Takam in October 2017 averaged 334,000 viewers.

Fight card

Broadcasting

See also

 Anthony Joshua vs. Wladimir Klitschko
 Boxing in Wales
 Sport in Wales

References

2018 in boxing
2018 in Welsh sport
World Boxing Association heavyweight championship matches
International Boxing Federation heavyweight championship matches
World Boxing Organization heavyweight championship matches
International Boxing Organization heavyweight championship matches
Boxing in Wales
Sky Sports
2018 in British sport
International sports competitions hosted by Wales
Sports competitions in Cardiff
Anthony Joshua vs. Joseph Parker
Pay-per-view boxing matches
Boxing matches involving Anthony Joshua